Gérald Edmond Louis Baticle (born 10 September 1969) is a French professional football manager and former player who played as a striker. He was most recently the manager of Angers in Ligue 1.

Playing career
Born in Amiens, Baticle started his professional career in his native Picardy region at Amiens but quickly attracted the attention of Guy Roux who recruited him at Auxerre. He played his first game in Ligue 1 on 19 September 1991 against Metz. In the 1992–93 season, he was the UEFA Cup's top goalscorer as Auxerre reached the semi-finals where they were edged out by Borussia Dortmund after a penalty shootout. A year later, Baticle scored one of Auxerre's goal during the final of the French cup where the AJA defeated Montpellier 3–0 to win its first national title. In the 1994–95 season, he had to face the concurrence of an emerging Lilian Laslandes for the sole striker post in Guy Roux's emblematic 4-3-3.

Baticle then chose to move to an ambitious Strasbourg side where he joined a team composed of Frank Leboeuf, Franck Sauzée and Aleksandr Mostovoi. He spent three seasons at Strasbourg and was a captain there after Leboeuf's departure in 1996. He was repositioned as an offensive midfielder by Jacky Duguépéroux and, in this position, was instrumental in Strasbourg's 1997 League cup triumph as well as the good UEFA Cup run the following season.

He was then back for a season and a half at Auxerre as a transition striker between world champion Stéphane Guivarc'h and the young Djibril Cissé. In December 1999, he was transferred to Metz where he enjoyed decent success as a striker for three years in a struggling team. When Metz was relegated, Baticle moved to Troyes for a season before ending his career in 2003–04 with Ligue 2 side Le Havre.

Coaching career
Baticle was a successful youth coach for three seasons with Auxerre's under 18 team, reaching the final of the Coupe Gambardella in 2007. In October 2008, Pascal Janin was sacked from his post at Stade Brestois and it was rumoured that general manager Corentin Martins was eager to bring his former Auxerre teammate at Brest for the managing job but the move was at first opposed by Auxerre's president Jean-Claude Hamel. Ultimately, a compromise was found and Baticle joined Brest, winning his first game 4–0 against Bastia on 7 November 2008. He was fired in May 2009 and replaced by Alex Dupont.

On 23 December 2022, Baticle was sacked by Angers.

Managerial statistics

Honours

As a player
 Coupe de France: 1994
 UEFA Intertoto Cup: 1995
 Coupe de la Ligue: 1997

As a manager
 Coupe Gambardella runner-up: 2007

References

External links
Player profile at Racingstub
Profile on Brest's site

1969 births
Living people
Sportspeople from Amiens
Association football forwards
French footballers
Amiens SC players
AJ Auxerre players
RC Strasbourg Alsace players
FC Metz players
Le Havre AC players
Ligue 1 players
Ligue 2 players
French football managers
Angers SCO managers
Stade Brestois 29 managers
Footballers from Hauts-de-France